M. Risso Bodie (May 10, 1896 – December 14, 1981) was an Italian professional American football fullback who played one season for the Chicago Cardinals of the National Football League (NFL). By playing in one game he became the first person born in Italy to ever play professionally.

Bodie was born on May 10, 1896 in Italy. Both his high school and college are unknown. In 1921, he became the first person born in Italy to play in an NFL game. He played in one game for the Chicago Cardinals (now known as the Arizona Cardinals) at the fullback position. He did not make any other appearances after the season. He died on December 14, 1981 in Stockton, California. He was 85 at the time of his death.

References

Italian players of American football
1896 births
1981 deaths
Chicago Cardinals players